Markham GO Station is a railway station on the GO Transit Stouffville line network located on Markham Main Street North in Markham, Ontario in Canada.

History

The station was built in 1871 by the Toronto and Nipissing Railway, which was taken over by the Grand Trunk Railway, which ultimately became part of the Canadian National Railway in 1923. It has been designated as a heritage railway station by the Historic Sites and Monuments Board of Canada.

The station design is based on a classic Canadian Railway Style with elements of the Vernacular-Carpenter Gothic architecture of the mid-19th century in Ontario.

The city of Markham purchased the building as a Millennium project and are undertaking its restoration in conjunction with the Markham Village Conservancy, which manages the station. In addition to facilities for GO Transit, the building is used as a community centre, with two rooms that have a capacity of 30 and 100 people, respectively, which are available for rental.

Services
Markham Station does not have a bus terminal. Connecting bus services serve on-street stops in front of the station.

GO Transit
 On weekdays, Stouffville line train service to Markham Station consists of 9 trains southbound to Union Station in the morning and 9 trains northbound to Lincolnville in the afternoon or late evening. Service at other times and in other directions is provided by GO bus route 71, which continues beyond Lincolnville to Uxbridge station.
 Route 54 (Hwy 407 East GO Bus) operates between Mount Joy and Highway 407 Bus Terminal.

York Region Transit
 41 Markham Local (rush hour only)
 301 Markham Express (rush hour only)

Toronto Transit Commission
  Markham Road northbound to Major Mackenzie Drive and southbound Warden Subway Station (second longest bus route after 54 Lawrence East).
This route is operated by the TTC on behalf of the YRT and charges a YRT fare. Those who want to cross Steeles Avenue (the boundary between Toronto and Markham) are required to pay a TTC fare (in addition to a YRT fare).

See also

 York Region Transit
 Toronto Transit Commission
 List of designated heritage railway stations of Canada

References

External links

GO Transit railway stations
Railway stations in Markham, Ontario
Railway stations in Canada opened in 1871
Canadian National Railway stations in Ontario
Designated heritage railway stations in Ontario
1871 establishments in Ontario